Epicydes or Epikudês (3rd century BC) was a Carthaginian general of Sicilian origin in the Second Punic War.

A Syracusan by origin, he was born and educated at Carthage as the son of a Carthaginian mother. His grandfather, after having been banished by Agathocles of Syracuse, had settled at Carthage. 

Epicydes served, together with his elder brother Hippocrates, with much distinction in the army of Hannibal, both in Spain and Italy. and when, after the battle of Cannae, Hieronymus of Syracuse sent to make overtures to Hannibal, that general selected the two brothers as his envoys to Syracuse and Epicydes was the leader of the Punic party in Syracuse. They soon gained over the wavering mind of the young king, and induced him to desert the Roman alliance. But the murder of Hieronymus shortly after, and the revolution that ensued at Syracuse, for a time deranged their plans. At first, they demanded merely a safe-conduct to return to Hannibal. But they soon found that they could do more good by their intrigues at Syracuse, where they even succeeded in procuring their election as generals in the place of Andranodorus and Themistus. 

But the Roman party again obtained the upper hand. After Hippocrates had been sent with a force to Leontini, Epicydes joined him there, and they set at defiance the Syracusan government. Leontini was, indeed, quickly reduced by Marcellus, but his cruelties there alienated the Syracusans, and still more the foreign mercenaries in their service. Of this disposition, Hippocrates and Epicydes (who had made their escape to Erbessus) ably availed themselves. They induced the troops sent against them to mutiny, and returned at their head to Syracuse, of which they made themselves masters with little difficulty in 214 BC.

Marcellus immediately proceeded to besiege Syracuse, the defence of which was conducted with ability and vigour by the two brothers, who had been again appointed generals. When the Roman commander found himself obliged to turn the siege into a blockade, Epicydes continued to hold the city itself, while Hippocrates conducted the operations in other parts of Sicily. The former was, however, unable to prevent the surprise of the Epipolae, which were betrayed into the hands of Marcellus. But still he exerted his utmost efforts against the Romans, and co-operated zealously with the army from without under Himilco and Hippocrates. After the defeat of the latter, Epicydes went in person to meet Bomilcar, who was advancing with a Carthaginian fleet to the relief of the city, and hasten his arrival. But, after the retreat of Bomilcar, he seems to have regarded the fall of Syracuse as inevitable, and withdrew to Agrigentum. Here he appears to have remained and co-operated with the Numidian Mutines, until the capture of Agrigentum (210 BC) obliged him to flee with Hanno to Carthage, after which his name is not again mentioned.

References

Footnotes

|width=25% align=center|Preceded by:Adranodoros
|width=25% align=center|Tyrant of Syracuse214 BC – 212 BC, with Hippocrates
|width=25% align=center|Succeeded by:Position abolished(Syracuse incorporated into the Roman province of Sicilia)
|-

Carthaginian commanders of the Second Punic War
3rd-century BC Punic people
Ancient Syracusans